Symmetry in Black is the tenth studio album by the American sludge metal band Crowbar. It was released on May 26, 2014 in Europe via Century Media Records and on May 27, 2014 in North America via eOne Music. This was the only album to feature bassist Jeff Golden, who was fired from the band in 2016.

Track listing

Personnel
Kirk Windstein – vocals, rhythm guitar
Matt Brunson – lead guitar
Jeff Golden – bass
Tommy Buckley – drums

Production
Kirk Windstein – production
Duane Simoneaux – production
Josh Wilbur – mixing

References

Crowbar (American band) albums
2014 albums
Century Media Records albums
E1 Music albums